Madame Vignon also known as Madame Vignon-Chauvin (19th century), was a French fashion designer Couturier.

Madame Vignon was an established fashion designer during the July Monarchy. She enjoyed a successful career, and came to have an influential position within the French fashion industry and mentioned as a member of the elite fashion designers in mid-19th-century Paris in the era of the Second Republic and Second Empire, alongside other top designers such as Madame Camille, Madame Palmyre and Madame Victorine.

As one of the top seamstresses in Paris, she and her main rival Madame Palmyre was engaged to deliver the 54 dresses trousseau of the new empress of France, Eugénie de Montijo, upon the wedding of Emperor Napoleon III in 1853; it was also Vignon who was given the assignment to design Eugenie´s wedding dress, which became internationally famous. She did the day dresses of the empress, while Pamyre did the evening dresses.

References

French fashion designers
French milliners
19th-century French businesswomen
19th-century French businesspeople
Year of birth missing
Year of death missing
People of the Second French Empire
People of the July Monarchy
French women fashion designers